Richard Michael Mayall (7 March 1958 – 9 June 2014) was an English actor, stand-up comedian and writer. He formed a close partnership with Ade Edmondson while they were students at Manchester University and was a pioneer of alternative comedy in the 1980s.

Mayall starred in numerous successful comedy series throughout his career, including The Young Ones, The Comic Strip Presents..., Blackadder, Filthy Rich & Catflap, The New Statesman, Bottom and Believe Nothing. Mayall also starred in the comedy films Drop Dead Fred and Guest House Paradiso; he won a Primetime Emmy Award for his voice-over work in The Willows in Winter. His comedic style was described as energetic "post-punk".

Mayall died suddenly at his home in London on 9 June 2014 at the age of 56. BBC Television director Danny Cohen praised him as a "truly brilliant" comedian with a unique stage presence, whose "fireball creativity" and approach to sitcom had inspired a generation of comedy stars.

Early life
The second of four children, Mayall was born on 7 March 1958 at 98 Matching Tye near Harlow, Essex, to Gillian (née Harrild; 1930–2018) and John Mayall (1925–2011). He had an older brother, Anthony, and two younger sisters, Libby and Kate. When Mayall was three years old, he and his parents—who taught drama—moved to Droitwich Spa, Worcestershire, where he spent the rest of his childhood and performed in his parents' plays.

He attended King's School, Worcester, to which he won a free scholarship. He failed most of his O-levels and scraped through A-levels. In 1975, Mayall went to the University of Manchester to study drama. He claimed that he failed to get a degree, or that he did not even turn up to his finals, but in reality he graduated with lower second-class honours in 1978. It was there that he met his future comedy partner Ade Edmondson; Ben Elton, a fellow student; and Lise Mayer, with whom he later co-wrote The Young Ones.

Career

Young Ones and The Comic Strip
Edmondson and Mayall gained their reputation at The Comedy Store, from 1980. Apart from performing in their double act, 20th Century Coyote, Mayall developed solo routines, using characters such as Kevin Turvey and a pompous anarchist poet named Rick. This led to Edmondson and Mayall, along with Comedy Store compere Alexei Sayle and other up-and-coming comedians, including Nigel Planer, Peter Richardson, French and Saunders, Arnold Brown, and Pete Richens setting up their own comedy club called "The Comic Strip" in the Raymond Revuebar, a strip club in Soho. Mayall's Kevin Turvey character gained a regular slot in A Kick Up the Eighties, first broadcast in 1981. He appeared as "Rest Home" Ricky in Richard O'Brien's Shock Treatment, a sequel to The Rocky Horror Picture Show. He played Dentonvale's resident attendant as the love interest to Nell Campbell's Nurse Ansalong.

Mayall's television appearances as Kevin Turvey led to a mockumentary based on the character titled Kevin Turvey – The Man Behind The Green Door, broadcast in 1982. The previous year, he appeared in a bit role in An American Werewolf in London. His stage partnership with Edmondson continued, with them often appearing together as "The Dangerous Brothers", hapless daredevils whose hyper-violent antics foreshadowed their characters in Bottom. Channel 4 offered the Comic Strip group six short films, which became The Comic Strip Presents..., debuting on 2 November 1982. The series, which continued sporadically for many years, saw Mayall play a wide variety of roles. It was known for anti-establishment humour and for parodies such as Bad News on Tour, a spoof "rockumentary" starring Mayall, Richardson, Edmondson and Planer as a heavy metal band.

At the time The Comic Strip Presents... was negotiated, the BBC took an interest in The Young Ones, a sitcom written by Mayall and his then-girlfriend Lise Mayer, in the same anarchic vein as Comic Strip. Ben Elton joined the writers. The series was commissioned and first broadcast in 1982, shortly after Comic Strip. Mayall played Rick, a pompous sociology student and Cliff Richard devotee. Mayall maintained his double-act with Edmondson, who starred as violent heavy metal medical student Vyvyan. Nigel Planer (as hippie Neil) and Christopher Ryan (as "Mike the cool person") also starred, with additional material written and performed by Alexei Sayle.

The first series was successful and a second was screened in 1984. The show owed a comic debt to Spike Milligan, but Milligan disapproved of Mayall's style of performance. Milligan once wrote: "Rik Mayall is putrid – absolutely vile. He thinks nose-picking is funny and farting and all that. He is the arsehole of British comedy."

In 1986, Mayall played the private detective in the video of "Peter Gunn" by Art of Noise featuring Duane Eddy.

Becoming a household name
Mayall continued to work on The Comic Strip films. He returned to stand-up comedy, performing on Saturday Live—a British version of the American Saturday Night Live—first broadcast in 1985. He and Edmondson had a regular section as "The Dangerous Brothers", their earlier stage act. In 1985, Mayall debuted another comic creation. He had appeared in the final episode of the first series of Blackadder (1983) as "Mad Gerald". He returned to play Lord Flashheart in the Blackadder II episode titled "Bells". A descendant of this character, Squadron Commander Flashheart, was in the Blackadder Goes Forth episode "Private Plane". In the same episode, he was reunited with Edmondson, who played German flying ace Baron von Richthofen the "Red Baron", in a scene where he comes to rescue Captain Blackadder from the Germans. A decade later, Mayall also appeared in Blackadder: Back & Forth as Robin Hood.

In 1986, Mayall joined Planer, Edmondson and Elton to star as Richie Rich in Filthy Rich & Catflap, which was billed as a follow-up to The Young Ones. The idea of Filthy Rich and Catflap was a reaction to comments made by Jimmy Tarbuck about The Young Ones. The series' primary focus was to highlight the "has been" status of light entertainment. While Mayall received positive critical reviews, viewing figures were poor and the series was never repeated on the BBC. In later years, release on video, DVD and repeats on UK TV found a following. Mayall suggested that the series did not last because he was uncomfortable acting in an Elton project, when they had been co-writers on The Young Ones. In the same year, Mayall had a No. 1 hit in the UK Singles Chart, when he and his co-stars from The Young Ones teamed with Cliff Richard to record "Living Doll" for the inaugural Comic Relief campaign. Mayall played Rick one last time in the Comic Relief stage-show and supported the Comic Relief cause for the rest of his life. 1987 saw Mayall co-star with Edmondson in one episode of the ITV sitcom Hardwicke House, although adverse reaction from press and viewers saw ITV withdraw the series after two episodes, leaving their appearance unbroadcast. He appeared on the children's television series Jackanory. His crazed portrayal of Roald Dahl's George's Marvellous Medicine proved memorable. However, the BBC received complaints "with viewers claiming both story and presentation to be both dangerous and offensive".

In 1987, Mayall played fictional Conservative MP Alan Beresford B'Stard in the sitcom The New Statesman (Yorkshire Television) written by Laurence Marks and Maurice Gran. The character was a satirical portrait of Tory Members of Parliament (MPs) in the United Kingdom in the 1980s and early 1990s. The programme ran for four series—incorporating two BBC specials—between 1987 and '94 and was successful critically and in the ratings. In a similar vein to his appearance on Jackanory, in 1989 Mayall starred in a series of bit shows for ITV called Grim Tales, in which he narrated Grimm Brothers fairy tales while puppets acted the stories. In the early 1990s, Mayall starred in humorous adverts for Nintendo games and consoles. With money from the ads, he bought his house in London which he called "Nintendo Towers".

1990s
In 1991, Edmondson and Mayall co-starred in the West End production of Beckett's Waiting for Godot at the Queen's Theatre, with Mayall playing Vladimir, Edmondson as Estragon and Christopher Ryan as Lucky. Here they came up with the idea for Bottom, which they said was a cruder cousin to Waiting for Godot. Bottom was commissioned by the BBC and three series were shown between 1991 and 1995. Mayall appeared in Bottom as Richard 'Richie' Richard alongside Edmondson's Eddie Elizabeth Hitler. The series featured slapstick violence taken to new extremes, and gained a strong cult following.

In 1993, following the second series, Mayall and Edmondson decided to take a stage-show version of the series on a national tour, Bottom: Live. It was a commercial success, filling large venues. Four additional stage shows were embarked upon in 1995, 1997, 2001 and 2003, each meeting with great success. The violent nature of these shows saw both Edmondson and Mayall ending up in hospital at various points. A film version, Guest House Paradiso was released in 1999. A fourth TV series was also written but not commissioned by the BBC.

Mayall starred alongside Phoebe Cates in Drop Dead Fred (1991) as the eponymous character, a troublesome imaginary friend who reappears from a woman's childhood. He also appeared in Carry On Columbus (1992) with other alternative comedians. Mayall also provided the voice of the character Froglip, the prince of the goblins, in the 1992 animated film adaption of the 1872 children's tale The Princess and the Goblin by George MacDonald. In 1993, he appeared in Rik Mayall Presents, six individual comedy dramas (Micky Love / Briefest Encounter / Dancing Queen / The Big One / Dirty Old Town / Clair de Lune). Mayall's performances won him a Best Comedy Performer award at that year's British Comedy Awards, and a second series of three was broadcast in early 1995. He provided the voice for Little Sod in Simon Brett's How to Be a Little Sod, written in 1991 and adapted as ten consecutive episodes broadcast by the BBC in 1995. In the early 1990s, he auditioned for the roles of Banzai, Zazu, and Timon in The Lion King (1994); he was asked to audition by lyricist Tim Rice but the role of Zazu went to Rowan Atkinson.

In 1995, Mayall featured in a production of the play Cell Mates alongside Stephen Fry. Not long into the run, Fry had a nervous breakdown and fled to Belgium, where he remained for several days, and the play closed early. In 2007, Mayall said of the incident: "You don't leave the trenches … selfishness is one thing, being a __ is another. I mustn't start that war again." Edmondson poked fun at the event during their stage tours. Also in 1995, Mayall provided the voice of Mr. Toad in The Wind in the Willows. In Bottom Live: The Big Number Two Tour, after Mayall gave mocking gestures to the audience and insulted their town in a silly voice, Edmondson said, "Have you finished yet? It's just I'm beginning to understand why Stephen Fry __ off." In Bottom Live 2003: Weapons Grade Y-Fronts Tour, after Richie accidentally fondles Eddie, he replies, "I see why Stephen Fry left that play." Towards the end of the Cell Mates run, Mayall revealed a replica gun—a prop from the play—to a passer-by in the street. Mayall was cautioned over the incident and later conceded that this was "incredibly stupid, even by my standards". From 1999, Mayall was the voice of the black-headed seagull Kehaar, in the first and second series of the animated television programme, Watership Down. In the late 1990s Mayall was featured in a number of adverts for Virgin Trains.

In 1998, Mayall was involved in a serious quad bike accident. The pair wrote the first draft of their feature film Guest House Paradiso while Mayall was still hospitalised. They planned to co-direct, but Edmondson took on the duties himself. Mayall returned to work doing voice-overs. His first post-accident acting job was in the 1998 Jonathan Creek Christmas special, as DI Gideon Pryke, a role he later reprised in 2013. Jonathan Creek also featured Adrian Edmondson in a recurring role, though the two did not appear in any episodes together.

2000s
In 2000, Mayall voiced around half of the characters for the PlayStation and Windows PC video game Hogs of War. Also that year, Mayall appeared in the video production of Jesus Christ Superstar as King Herod. He joked in the "making of" documentary, which was included on the DVD release, that "the real reason why millions of people want to come and see this is because I'm in it! Me and Jesus!" In 2001, Mayall acted as Lt Daniel Blaney in the episode "The White Knight Stratagem" from the series "Murder Rooms: The Mysteries of the Real Sherlock Holmes." In 2002, Mayall teamed up with Marks and Gran once more when he starred as Professor Adonis Cnut in the ITV sitcom, Believe Nothing. However, the sitcom failed to repeat the success of The New Statesman and lasted for only one series.

Following 2003's Bottom: Live tour, Bottom 5: Weapons Grade Y-Fronts, Mayall stated that he and Edmondson would return with another tour.

In 2004 Mayall had a starring cameo role playing the record boss in the video short "ABBA: Our Last Video Ever".

Mayall voiced Edwin in the BBC show Shoebox Zoo. In September 2005, he released an 'in-character' semi-fictionalised autobiography titled Bigger than Hitler, Better than Christ. At the same time, he starred in a new series for ITV, All About George. In 2006, Mayall reprised the role of Alan B'Stard in the play The New Statesman 2006: Blair B'stard Project, written by Marks and Gran. By this time B'Stard had left the floundering Conservatives and become a Labour MP. In 2007, following a successful two-month run in London's West End at the Trafalgar Studios, a heavily re-written version toured theatres nationwide, with Marks and Gran constantly updating the script to keep it topical. However, Mayall succumbed to chronic fatigue and flu in May 2007 and withdrew from the show. Alan B'Stard was played by his understudy, Mike Sherman during his hiatus.

Mayall was cast as the poltergeist Peeves in Harry Potter and the Philosopher's Stone (2001), the first of the Harry Potter films, although all of his scenes were cut from the film. He had not been made aware that his scenes had been cut until the full film was officially unveiled at the premiere. During filming, the children in the cast were unable to suppress their giggles when he was filming and would corpse. Since Mayall's death there has been an outcry for the release of this footage from his fans. He told the story of this hiring/firing on his second website blog for his film, Evil Calls: The Raven (2008). For Evil Calls, Mayall's role as Winston the Butler was shot in 2002, when the film was titled Alone in the Dark. The film was not completed until 2008, and was released under its new Evil Calls title to distance it from the Alone in the Dark computer game film.

Mayall provided the voice of the Andrex puppy in the TV commercials for Andrex toilet paper, and also had a voice part in the Domestos cleaning product adverts. He performed the voice of King Arthur in the children's television cartoon series, King Arthur's Disasters, alongside Matt Lucas who plays Merlin. Mayall also had a recurring role in the Channel Five remake of the lighthearted drama series, Minder. He also provided the voice of Cufflingk in the 2005 animated film Valiant.

In September 2009, Mayall played a supporting role in the television programme Midsomer Murders—shown on ITV1 and made by Meridian Broadcasting—as David Roper, a recovering party animal and tenuous friend of the families in and around Chettham Park House.

2010–2014
In April 2010, Motivation Records released Mayall's England Football anthem "Noble England" for the 2010 FIFA World Cup which he recorded with producer Dave Loughran at Brick Lane Studios in London. The release, on 26 April, was designed to coincide with St George's Day and the baptism of Shakespeare. On the track, Mayall performs an adapted speech from Shakespeare's Henry V. In June 2010, the official BBC Match of the Day compilation CD (2010 Edition) was released by Sony/Universal featuring Noble England. After Mayall's death in 2014, a campaign led by Jon Morter began to get "Noble England" to No. 1 during the 2014 FIFA World Cup. It rapidly climbed the official charts in the United Kingdom and reached no. 7.

In September 2010, an audio book, narrated by Mayall, Cutey and the Sofaguard was released by Digital Download. The book was written by Chris Wade and released by Wisdom Twins Books. In the same month, Mayall played the voice of Roy's Dad and recorded five episodes of animation In November 2010, Mayall provided narrative for five different characters for CDs accompanying children's books published by Clickety Books. The books aid speech and language development by bombarding the child with troublesome sound targets. He recorded introductions and narratives for the titles.

On 5 March 2011, Mayall appeared on Let's Dance for Comic Relief in which he came on stage and attacked Ade Edmondson with a frying pan during his performance of The Dying Swan ballet. Edmondson mentioned backstage that it was the first time in eight years they had done something like that together and claimed Mayall had left with a small bump on his head. It would be the last time the duo performed together in public.

In April 2011, Mayall again revived the character of Alan B'Stard to make an appearance in a satirical television advertisement for the No2AV campaign prior to the 2011 voting reform referendum in the UK. The character is shown being elected under the alternative vote system, then using his newly gained position of power to renege on his campaign promises. In his personal life, Rik Mayall did not support the alternative vote. In May 2011 Mayall became the eponymous 'Bombardier' in a TV advertising campaign for Bombardier Bitter in the UK. The adverts landed broadcaster UKTV Dave in trouble with Ofcom when they were found to breach the Ofcom code for linking alcohol with sexual attractiveness or success.

On 23 August 2012, the BBC announced that Edmondson and Mayall's characters of Richie and Eddie would be returning in 2013 in Hooligan's Island, a television adaptation of their 1997 tour of the same name. However, on 15 October 2012, Edmondson announced during an interview with BBC radio presenter Mark Powlett that the project was cancelled prior to production as he wished to pursue other interests.

In September 2012, Mayall starred in The Last Hurrah, a six-episode, full-cast audio series that he also co-wrote with Craig Green and Dominic Vince.

In November 2012, Mayall narrated several children's books on the Me Books app, such as The Getaway and Banana! by children's illustrator and author Ed Vere.

In October 2013 he appeared in Channel 4 sitcom Man Down, playing the father of the protagonist, Greg Davies—despite being only ten years older.

On 7 May 2014, Mayall made one of his last recorded performances in the form of poetry and voice-overs read on English rock band Magic Eight Ball's second album 'Last Of The Old Romantics' (released on 10 November 2014).

Mayall's final TV appearance was in the first episode of the second series of Crackanory, which was broadcast posthumously on 24 September 2014 on Dave.

Personal life

Family
Mayall married Scottish make-up artist Barbara Robbin in 1985, and the couple had three children. The couple met in 1981 while filming A Kick Up the Eighties and embarked on a secret affair. At the time, Mayall was in a long-term relationship with Lise Mayer. Upon discovering that Robbin was pregnant, Mayall left Mayer (who was also pregnant with his child at the time) while on a shopping trip with her and Ben Elton, and eloped with Robbin to Barbados. Mayer would later suffer a miscarriage. In a 2002 newspaper article, Mayall said that Mayer had since forgiven him.

Political activism
Mayall twice publicly involved himself in political campaigns. In 2002, he dressed up as Adolf Hitler for a cinema advertisement opposing the United Kingdom abolishing its national currency the Pound sterling in favour of the Euro, as a part of its membership of the European Union. In the United Kingdom Alternative Vote Referendum of 2011, he appeared in a television broadcast for the 'No' campaign in character as Alan B'Stard to oppose the adoption of an alternative non-proportional electoral system for Westminster Parliamentary elections.

Quad bike accident
On 9 April 1998, Mayall was injured when he crashed a quad bike near his home in Devon. Mayall's daughter Bonnie and her cousin had asked him to take them for a ride on the bike—a Christmas gift from his wife—but he refused because of bad weather approaching, and he went on out alone. Mayall remembered nothing about the accident. His wife Barbara looked out of the window and saw him lying on the ground trapped beneath the quad, which had turned over on top of him. Mayall later joked that his wife believed he was fooling around and initially left him for a few minutes. He was airlifted to Plymouth's Derriford Hospital, with two haematomas and a fractured skull. During the following 96 hours, he was kept sedated to prevent movement which could cause pressure on his brain. His family was warned that he could die or have brain damage. He was in an induced coma for several days. After five days doctors felt it safe to bring him back to consciousness. In a BBC Radio 2 interview in 2000, Mayall said that when filming Guest House Paradiso, Edmondson would make sure he had afternoons free to rest from filming following the accident.

During Mayall's hospitalisation, the Comic Strip special Four Men in a Car was broadcast for the first time. The film involves Mayall's character being hit by a car. Mayall and Edmondson joked about the event in stage versions of Bottom, Edmondson quipping "If only I'd fixed those brakes properly", Mayall referring to "quad bike flashbacks", and Mayall referring to himself: "You must know him, that tosser who fell off the quad bike." In his 2005 spoof autobiography, Mayall claims that he rose from the dead.

Death
On 9 June 2014, Mayall died at his home in Barnes, Richmond-upon-Thames, London, following a sudden heart attack after a morning jog. He was 56 years old. His funeral took place on 19 June 2014, at St. George's Church in Dittisham, Devon. Among the attendees were Dawn French, Jennifer Saunders, Peter Richardson, Alan Rickman and Mayall's Young Ones co-stars Ade Edmondson, Nigel Planer and Alexei Sayle, along with Young Ones co-writer Ben Elton. Edmondson also served as a pallbearer. In accordance with his wishes, he was buried on his family estate at Pasture Farm, East Allington, Devon.

Recognition, critical opinion and legacy

2005, Channel 4 poll, Comedians' Comedian, Mayall was voted among the top 50 comedy performers of all time.
2008, Mayall was awarded an honorary Doctor of Letters (DLitt) from the University of Exeter. True to form, his acceptance speech contained a swear word, and reference to his indifferent performance as a student.
2010, Mayall was present in Blackpool in August 2010 for the ceremonial laying of the first slab in the Comedy Carpet, commemorating one of his lines from The Young Ones.
2010, poll, "Top 100 Stand-Up Comedians", Mayall was placed 91st.
2014, on his death, The Guardian described Mayall as an actor whose "onscreen performances were so full of life. His characters weren't neatly drawn sketches: they were vast mad scribbles, jammed to the margins with noise and energy". Commenting on his role in the sitcom Blackadder, it noted, "Upstaging an entire fleet of world-class comedians should have been impossible. Mayall made it look effortless", and that he had replicated this success in his other best-known shows, by becoming the "face of the show" in The Young Ones and creating an "iconic" figure in The New Statesman character, Alan B'Stard.
2014, as a tribute to Mayall, an unofficial blue plaque appeared in Hammersmith, London, which referenced the opening title sequence of BBC sitcom series Bottom. At the same time, an online petition was launched in an effort to persuade Hammersmith & Fulham Council to install a memorial bench on Hammersmith Broadway. On 14 November 2014, a memorial bench for Mayall was unveiled on the same spot where the bench from Bottom used to be before its removal.
2014, a  mural of Mayall was created by street artist Gnasher, on the Playhouse at Mayall's birthplace in Harlow, Essex.

Filmography

Film

Television

Stage

Video games

He was originally going to be the voice of Newton in 2014's LittleBigPlanet 3, However his death caused Sumo Digital to hire a new actor.

Books
Bigger than Hitler – Better than Christ (2005) (semi-autobiographical), HarperCollins,

Audiobooks

Awards and nominations
 1993 – British Comedy Award for Best TV Comedy Actor – won
 1997 – Primetime Emmy Award for Outstanding Voice-Over Performance – won

References

External links

 
 
 
 
 Rik Mayall Interviews and Articles Archive at wordpress.com
 

1958 births
2014 deaths
20th-century English comedians
20th-century English male actors
21st-century English comedians
21st-century English male actors
Alumni of the Victoria University of Manchester
Audiobook narrators
British male comedy actors
British surrealist artists
British surrealist writers
Comedians from Essex
Comedians from Worcestershire
English male comedians
English male film actors
English male stage actors
English male television actors
English male video game actors
English male voice actors
Male actors from Essex
Male actors from Worcestershire
People educated at King's School, Worcester
People from Droitwich Spa
People from Epping
People from Harlow
People with epilepsy
People with traumatic brain injuries
Primetime Emmy Award winners
The Comic Strip
Writers from Essex
Writers from Worcestershire